The Sports Emmy Award for Outstanding Live Sports Special has been awarded since 1976. It is awarded to a network for their coverage of one specific sporting event in a calendar year, which means it should not be confused with the award for Outstanding Live Sports Series.

List of winners
1975-76:  1975 World Series (NBC) 
1976-77: 1976 Summer Olympics (ABC)
1977-78: Heavyweight championship boxing match between Muhammad Ali and Leon Spinks (CBS)
1978-79: Super Bowl XIII (NBC)
1979-80: 1980 Winter Olympics (ABC)
1980-81: 1981 Kentucky Derby (ABC)
1981-82: 1982 Men's NCAA Basketball National Championship game between the University of North Carolina and Georgetown University (CBS)
1982-83: 1982 World Series (NBC)
1983-84: no award was given
1984-85: 1984 Summer Olympics (ABC)
1985-86: no award was given
1986-87: 1987 Daytona 500 (CBS)
1987-88: 1987 Kentucky Derby (ABC)
1988: 1988 Summer Olympics (NBC)
1989: 1989 Indianapolis 500 (ABC)
1990: 1990 Indianapolis 500 (ABC)
1991: 1991 NBA Finals (NBC)
1992: 1992 Breeders Cup (NBC)
1993: 1993 World Series (CBS)
1994: 1994 Stanley Cup Finals (ESPN)
1995: The September 6, 1995 baseball game in which Cal Ripken Jr. played in his 2,131st consecutive game, breaking a record previously held by Lou Gehrig (ESPN)
1996: 1996 World Series (FOX)
1997: 1997 NBA Finals (NBC)
1998: September 8, 1998 Cardinals/Cubs baseball game in which Mark McGwire hit his 62nd home run of the season. (FOX)
1999: 1999 Major League Baseball All-Star Game (FOX)
2000: 2000 World Series (FOX)
2001: 2001 World Series (FOX)
2002: 2002 Winter Olympics (NBC)
2003: 2003 Major League Baseball postseason (FOX)
2004: 2004 Masters Tournament (CBS)
 Major League Baseball: Division Series (ESPN)
 Super Bowl XXXVIII (CBS)
 2004 Wimbledon Championships (NBC)
 2004 World Series (FOX)
2005: 2005 Open Championship (TNT)
 2005 Little League World Series (ABC/ESPN)
 2005 Masters Tournament (CBS)
 2005 Preakness Stakes (NBC)
 2005 World Series (FOX)
2006: 2006 Major League Baseball postseason (FOX)
 2006 FIFA World Cup (ABC)
 Indianapolis Colts - Pittsburgh Steelers Divisional Playoff (CBS)
 2006 Masters Tournament (CBS)
 2006 Preakness Stakes (NBC)
2007: 2007 Tostitos Fiesta Bowl (FOX)
 Dallas Cowboys - Seattle Seahawks Wild Card Playoff (NBC)
 2007 Daytona 500 (FOX)
 2007 AFC Championship Game (CBS)
 2007 Open Championship (ABC/ESPN)
 Super Bowl XLI (CBS)
2008: 2008 U.S. Open Golf Championship (NBC)
 2008 Daytona 500 (FOX)
 Super Bowl XLII (FOX)
 2008 Wimbledon Championships – Men's Singles final (NBC)
 X Games XIV (ESPN)
2009: Super Bowl XLIII (NBC)
 2009 Breeders' Cup (ESPN)
 2009 Indianapolis 500 (ABC)
 2009 NBA Playoffs (TNT)
 2009 Stanley Cup Finals (NBC)
 2009 World Series (FOX)
2010: 2010 FIFA World Cup Final (ABC)
 2010 Breeders' Cup (ESPN)
 2010 Masters Tournament (CBS)
 2010 NBA Finals (ABC)
 2010 Ryder Cup (NBC/USA)
 2010 Tour de France (Versus)
2011: 2011 World Series (FOX)
 2011 Daytona 500 (FOX)
 2011 FIFA Women's World Cup Final (ESPN)
 2011 Masters Tournament (CBS)
 2011 Stanley Cup Finals (NBC/Versus)
2012: Super Bowl XLVI (NBC)
 2012 Army–Navy Game (CBS)
 2012 Indianapolis 500 (ABC)
 2012 Masters Tournament (CBS)
 2012 World Series (FOX)
2013: 2013 World Series (FOX)
 2013 America's Cup (NBCSN)
 2013 Daytona 500 (FOX)
 2013 NBA Finals (ABC/ESPN)
 2013 Wimbledon Championships (ABC/ESPN)
2014: Super Bowl XLIX (NBC)
 146th Belmont Stakes (NBC)
 2014 FIFA World Cup Final (ABC)
 2015 College Football Playoff National Championship (ESPN)
 2014 Daytona 500 (FOX)
2015: Super Bowl 50 (CBS)
 147th Belmont Stakes (NBC)
 2015 NBA All-Star Saturday Night (TNT)
 2015 World Series (FOX)
 2015 Masters Tournament (CBS)
2016: 2016 World Series (FOX)
 2016 NBA Finals (ABC)
 2016 Summer Olympics (NBC)
 2017 College Football Playoff National Championship (ESPN)
 Super Bowl LI (FOX)
2017: 118th Army-Navy Game (CBS)
 2017 Masters Tournament (CBS)
 2017 Open Championship (NBC/Golf Channel)
 2017 World Series (FOX)
 2018 College Football Playoff National Championship (ESPN)
2018: 2018 World Series (FOX)
 150th Belmont Stakes (NBC)
 2018 Tour Championship (NBC/Golf Channel)
 2019 College Football Playoff National Championship (ESPN)
 Super Bowl LIII (CBS)
2019: 2019 Masters (CBS)
 2019 Stanley Cup finals (NBC)
 2019 FIFA Women's World Cup final (Fox)
 61st Daytona 500 (Fox)
 115th World Series (Fox)
2020: 2020 NBA All-Star Game (TNT/TBS)
 The Match: Champions for Charity (TNT/TBS/HLN/TruTV)
 146th Kentucky Derby (NBC)
 Super Bowl LV (CBS)
 116th World Series (Fox)
2021: 2021 MLB at Field of Dreams (Fox)
 122nd Army–Navy Game (CBS)
 103rd PGA Championship (CBS)
 Games of the XXXII Olympiad (NBC/CNBC/Golf Channel/NBCSN/USA/Olympic Channel)
 Super Bowl LVI (NBC)

Total awards
NBC - 12
FOX - 12
ABC - 8
CBS - 7
ESPN - 2
TNT - 1

References

Live Sports Special